The normal-inverse Gaussian distribution (NIG) is a continuous probability distribution that is defined as the normal variance-mean mixture where the mixing density is the inverse Gaussian distribution. The NIG distribution was noted by Blaesild in 1977 as a subclass of the generalised hyperbolic distribution discovered by Ole Barndorff-Nielsen. In the next year Barndorff-Nielsen published the NIG in another paper. It was introduced in the mathematical finance literature in 1997.

The parameters of the normal-inverse Gaussian distribution are often used to construct a heaviness and skewness plot called the NIG-triangle.

Properties

Moments

The fact that there is a simple expression for the moment generating function implies that simple expressions for all moments are available.

Linear transformation

This class is closed under affine transformations, since it is a particular case of the Generalized hyperbolic distribution, which has the same property. If
  
then

Summation

This class is infinitely divisible, since it is a particular case of the Generalized hyperbolic distribution, which has the same property.

Convolution

Related distributions

The class of NIG distributions is a flexible system of distributions that includes fat-tailed and skewed distributions, and the normal distribution,  arises as a special case by setting  and letting .

Stochastic process

The normal-inverse Gaussian distribution can also be seen as the marginal distribution of the normal-inverse Gaussian process which provides an alternative way of explicitly constructing it. Starting with a drifting Brownian motion (Wiener process), we can define the inverse Gaussian process  Then given a second independent drifting Brownian motion, the normal-inverse Gaussian process is the time-changed process . The process  at time  has the normal-inverse Gaussian distribution described above. The NIG process is a particular instance of the more general class of Lévy processes.

As a variance-mean mixture
Let  denote the inverse Gaussian distribution and  denote the normal distribution. Let , where ; and let , then  follows the NIG distribution, with parameters, . This can be used to generate NIG variates by ancestral sampling. It can also be used to derive an EM algorithm for maximum-likelihood estimation of the NIG parameters.

References

Continuous distributions